The 1991 Delaware Fightin' Blue Hens football team represented the University of Delaware as a member of the Yankee Conference during the 1991 NCAA Division I-AA football season. Led by 26th-year head coach Tubby Raymond, the Fightin' Blue Hens compiled an overall record of 10–2 with a mark of 7–1 in conference play, sharing the Yankee Conference title with New Hampshire and Villanova. Delaware advanced to the NCAA Division I-AA Football Championship playoffs, where Fightin' Blue Hens lost in the first round to {James Madison. The team played home games at Delaware Stadium in Newark, Delaware.

Schedule

Roster

References

Delaware
Delaware Fightin' Blue Hens football seasons
Yankee Conference football champion seasons
Delaware Fightin' Blue Hens football